The Indian Hemp Drugs Commission Report, completed in 1894, was an Indo-British study of cannabis usage in British India.

By 2 March 1893, the House of Commons of the United Kingdom was concerned with the effects of hemp drugs in the province of Bengal, India. The Government of India convened a seven-member commission to look into these questions, commencing their study on 3 July 1893. Lord Kimberley suggested modifying the scope of the investigation to be expanded to include all of India.

The report the commission produced was at least 3,281 pages long, with testimony from almost 1,200 "doctors, coolies, yogis, fakirs, heads of lunatic asylums, bhang peasants, tax gatherers, smugglers, army officers, hemp dealers, ganja palace operators and the clergy." A sociological analysis of the report reveals that the commission's visits to asylums all over India helped to undermine the then prevailing belief that consumption of ganja causes insanity.

The president of the commission was Mr. W. Mackworth Young, and other members include H.T. Ommanney, A. H. L. Fraser, Surgeon-Major C.J.H. Warden, Raja Soshi Sikhareshwar Roy, Kanwar Harnam Singh, and Lala Nihal Chand. Serving as secretary was Mr. H.J. McIntosh.

Conclusions
This extensively well-prepared and thorough report summarised the effects (potentially negative) of cannabis in a chapter dedicated to that. Here is the end of that chapter:

Physical effects

Mental effects

Moral effects

Discussion

See also
 La Guardia Committee
 National Commission on Marihuana and Drug Abuse

References

Further reading

External links
 http://www.druglibrary.org/schaffer/library/studies/inhemp/ihmenu.htm text of the study
 Report of the Indian Hemp Drugs Commission, 1894–1895 volumes 1–8 from National Library of Scotland

1894 in cannabis
1894 documents
Cannabis in Bangladesh
Cannabis in India
Cannabis in Pakistan
Cannabis in the United Kingdom
Cannabis law reform
Cannabis research
Hemp Drugs